Alvin Elmore Alcorn (September 7, 1912 – July 10, 2003) was an American jazz trumpeter.

Career
Alcorn learned music theory from his brother. In the early 1930s, he was a member of the Sunny South Syncopators led by Armand J. Piron. He worked in Texas as a member of Don Albert's swing band, but he spent most his career in New Orleans in the dixieland bands of Paul Barbarin, Sidney Desvigne, Oscar Celestin, and Octave Crosby.

During the 1950s, he went to Los Angeles to join the band of Kid Ory, then a couple years later returned to New Orleans. He went on tour in Europe with Chris Barber in the late 1970s and continued to perform into the 1980s.

References

External links

1912 births
2003 deaths
American jazz trumpeters
American male trumpeters
African-American jazz musicians
Jazz musicians from New Orleans
20th-century American musicians
20th-century trumpeters
20th-century American male musicians
American male jazz musicians
Onward Brass Band members
Olympia Brass Band members
20th-century African-American musicians
21st-century African-American people